Oncopeltus varicolor is a species of seed bug in the family Lygaeidae, found in North, Central, and South America.

Subspecies
These two subspecies belong to the species Oncopeltus varicolor:
 Oncopeltus varicolor stalii Distant, 1882
 Oncopeltus varicolor varicolor (Fabricius, 1794)

References

External links

 

Lygaeidae
Insects described in 1794